The 1996 National Camogie League is a competition in the women's team field sport of camogie was won by Cork, who defeated Galway in the final, played at Páirc Uí Rinn.

Arrangements
Cork beat Kilkenny 4-9 to 2-8 and the Galway beat Kilkenny 6-13 to 5-12 in the semi-final, a first ever victory by Galway over Kilkenny at senior level. Martina Harkins scored the match clinching goal in the last two minutes.

The Final
Galway managed to core the first two points in the final but Cork replied with 1-4 in a five-minute period, the goal coming from Irene O'Keeffe and led 2-11 to 1-4 at half-time. Galway’s last score of the game came ten minutes into the second half. Galway reversed the result in the All-Ireland final three months later.

Division 2
The Junior National League, known since 2006 as Division Two, was won by Limerick who defeated Down in the final.

Final stages

References

External links
 Camogie Association

National Camogie League
1996